Rodrigo Bruno (born 15 May  1987) is an Argentinian professional rugby union player. He plays as a flanker or Number 8 for the Selknam in Súper Liga Americana de Rugby having previously played professionally for Pampas XV & Lazio and internationally for Argentina.

References

1987 births
Living people
Argentina international rugby union players
Rugby union number eights
Rugby union flankers